Back to the Trenches  is a double live album by the Scottish hard rock band Nazareth, released in 2001.  A collection of thirty-one live tracks taken from the soundboards of six concerts, on both sides of the Atlantic, between 1972 and 1984, only nine of these tunes are featured on the band's acclaimed 1981 double live album 'Snaz. A line on the CD sleeve says, "This brings you Nazareth in their element - up there doing it".

The CD comes with a 52-page booklet containing old photos and interviews with Pete Agnew and Dan McCafferty. It also was issued on vinyl.

Pete Frame of Rock Family Trees fame was commissioned to draw up a Nazareth family tree based on info taken from an interview.

Disc one 
 Tracks 1–10 Paris Theatre, London 1972 (same tracks as on BBC Radio 1 Live in Concert album
 Tracks 11–14 Hammersmith Odeon 1980

Disc two 
 Tracks 1–4 Glasgow Apollo 1981
 Tracks 5–11 Fort Pierce 1982
 Tracks 12–14 Vancouver 1983
 Tracks 15–17 Slough 1984

CD1 track listing

CD2 track listing

Personnel 
 Dan McCafferty - lead vocals, bagpipes in "Hair of the Dog"
 Manny Charlton – guitars
 Billy Rankin – guitars
 Zal Cleminson - guitar
 Pete Agnew - bass guitar, backing vocals
 John Locke - keyboards
 Darrell Sweet – drums

References 

Nazareth (band) live albums
2001 live albums